Soğukpınar can refer to the following villages in Turkey:

 Soğukpınar, Alanya
 Soğukpınar, Çat
 Soğukpınar, Ceyhan
 Soğukpınar, Düzce
 Soğukpınar, Giresun
 Soğukpınar, İnebolu
 Soğukpınar, Kovancılar
 Soğukpınar, Sivrice